Wolfgang is the full-length debut studio album from Filipino rock band Wolfgang. The album was released in 1995. The album went Platinum less than a year after release.

Track listing

Personnel
 Basti Artadi - vocals
 Manuel Legarda - guitar
 Wolf Gemora - drums
 Mon Legaspi - bass

Album Credits 
Executive Producer: F.C. Magcale
Assistant Producer: Neil Gregorio
Production Assistant: Ponz Martinez
Engineer" Voltaire Orpiano
Cover Illustration: Basti Artadi
Cover Execution" J. Bernal / P. Compañer

References

External links 
Wolfgang Website
Wolfgang Discography

1995 debut albums
Wolfgang (band) albums